Cotana tenebricosa is a moth in the family Eupterotidae. It was described by Hering in 1931. It is found in New Guinea.

References

Moths described in 1931
Eupterotinae